Baron Adrian, of Cambridge in the County of Cambridge, was a title in the Peerage of the United Kingdom. It was created on 27 January 1955 for the electrophysiologist and Nobel Prize recipient Edgar Adrian. He was succeeded by his only son, the second Baron. He was Professor of cell physiology at the University of Cambridge. He was childless and the title became extinct on his death in 1995.

Barons Adrian (1955)
Edgar Douglas Adrian, 1st Baron Adrian (1889–1977)
Richard Hume Adrian, 2nd Baron Adrian (1927–1995)

References

Kidd, Charles, Williamson, David (editors). Debrett's Peerage and Baronetage (1990 edition). New York: St Martin's Press, 1990.

Extinct baronies in the Peerage of the United Kingdom
Noble titles created in 1955